The Architectural Centre Inc is a nonprofit organization in Wellington, New Zealand, for architects and laypeople with an interest in architecture which offers lectures, site visits, tours and exhibitions.

History of the centre

The centre was established in 1946 in Wellington, New Zealand.  It ran the first architectural school in Wellington (1946–1956), and the first town planning school in New Zealand (1949–1956).  It also ran the Centre Gallery (1953–1968), an early venue for exhibiting modern art, and published Design Review (1948–1954) – one of the first design-oriented journals in New Zealand.

The centre has also held many exhibitions, including:
 Te Aro Replanned (1947/48)
 Vertical Living/ Living in Cities (1954)
 196X (1960)
 Harbour Front (1971)
 Unbuilt Wellington (1987)
 Home made Home (1991)
 Reclaiming (Northern Gateway Exhibition) (1999)
 Manifesto exhibition (2006)

It has lobbied the Wellington City Council about issues to do with Wellington's built environment and run competitions, such as the annual 20under40 24 hour ideas competition, which began in 1990. More recently, the Architectural Centre published an architectural manifesto (2006), and has been a partner in the organisation of Wellington Architecture Week.

Past and present members of the Architectural Centre include:

 Bill Alington (born 1929)
 Ian Athfield (1940–2015)
 James Albert Beard (1924–2017)
 Sandy Beach
 Jock Beere (1913–2001)
 Guy Cleverley
 John Watson Cox (1902–1984)
 Deb Cranko
 Ken Davis
 Helmut Einhorn (1911–1988)
 Charles Fearnley (1915–1988)
 Al Gabites
 Julia Gatley
 Kate Linzey
 Christina Mackay
 Guy Marriage
 Lew Martin (1920–2013)
 Christine McCarthy
 Stephen McDougall
 Simon Mclellan
 Alan Minty
 Gordon Moller
 Geoff Nees (1923–1999)
 Tim Nees
 Fred Newman (1900–1964)
 Stuart Niven
 Gerald Parsonson
 Maurice Patience (1915–1986)
 Ernst Plischke (1903–1992)
 George Porter (1921–1998)
 Ian Reynolds (1922–2005)
 Bill Sutch (1907–1975)
 Bill Toomath (1925–2014)
 Anthony Treadwell (1922–2003)
 Paul Walker (born 1958)
 Roger Walker (born 1942)
 Simon Wilberforce
 Allan Wild (1927–2019)
 Derek Wilson (1922–2016)
 Keith Wilson

Membership
Membership is about 150, and a regular newsletter is published.

References
 Architectural Centre (N.Z.) Demonstration House (Wellington: Architectural Centre, 195-?)
 Architectural Centre (Wellington, N.Z.) Wgtn 196X: city development (Wellington: Architectural Centre, 1961)
 Architectural Centre Wellington’s northern gateway: an exhibition of the rail-yards, ports of Wellington and associated land by the Architectural Centre: November 1999. (Wellington: Architectural Centre, 1999)
 "Architectural Centre Aims at High Ideals" The Dominion (Wednesday 2 April 1947) p. 6.
 "Architectural Centre's "Ideal" House" Building Progress (March 1949) p. 34.
 Beard, James Albert, Social concern, building and the Architectural Centre, Wellington (Wellington: New Zealand Heritage and Conservation Trust and Wellington Heritage and Conservation Trust, 1997)
 Design review (Wellington: Architectural Centre, 1948)
 Gatley, Julia "A Contemporary Dwelling: The Demonstration House" Zeal and Crusade: the modern movement in Wellington ed John Wilson (Christchurch: Te Waihora Press, c1996) pp. 88–95.
 "Homes Without Sprawl – An Exhibition about Houses and gardens prepared by the Architectural Centre" Home & Building (1 August 1958) v. XXI, n. 3, pp. 33–37.
 Marriage, Guy "Doing each other's thing" Architecture New Zealand (Jan/Feb 2005) n. 1, pp. 78–79.
 Walker, Paul "Order from Chaos: Replanning Te Aro" Zeal and Crusade: the modern movement in Wellington ed John Wilson (Christchurch: Te Waihora Press, c1996) pp. 79–87.
 "What is 'the Architectural Centre'?" Design Review (Apr/May 1949) v. 1, n. 6, pp. 17–18.

External links
Architectural Centre. Official site.
City Gallery Wellington – Cuttings from the Centre exhibition, 1996
Eventfinder: Wellington Architecture Week

See also
SAHANZ Society of Architectural Historians
Auckland Architecture Association or  weblink
The  Architecture Centre Network
Heritage New Zealand or  weblink

History organisations based in New Zealand
Architecture in New Zealand
Heritage organizations
1946 establishments in New Zealand
Culture in Wellington